Devosia honganensis is a Gram-negative and strictly aerobic bacteria from the genus of Devosia which has been isolated from soil from a chemical factory in Hongan in China.

References

Hyphomicrobiales
Bacteria described in 2016